Victor Bailey may refer to:

 Victor Albert Bailey (1895–1964), British-Australian physicist
 Victor Bailey (musician) (1960–2016), American bass guitar player
 Victor Bailey (American football) (born 1970), former American football player